The Stridsvagn 103 (Strv 103), also known as the Alternative S and S-tank, is a Swedish post-World War II main battle tank, designed and manufactured in Sweden. "Strv" is the Swedish military abbreviation of stridsvagn, Swedish for chariot and tank (literally combat wagon), while the 103 comes from being the third tank in Swedish service to be equipped with a 10 cm gun.

Developed in the 1950s, it was the first main battle tank to use a gas turbine engine and the only mass-produced tank since World War II to dispense with a turret besides the German Kanonenjagdpanzer. It has an unconventional design with a unique gun laying process: it is turretless with a fixed gun traversed by engaging the tracks (like the 75 mm gun on the 1930s French Char B1) and elevated by adjusting the hull suspension.
The result was a very low-profile design with an emphasis on survivability and heightened crew protection level. Strv 103s formed a major portion of the Swedish armoured forces from the 1960s to the 1990s, when, along with the Centurions, it was replaced by the Leopard 2 variants Stridsvagn 121 and Stridsvagn 122.

While most turretless armoured fighting vehicles are classified as assault guns or tank destroyers, the Strv 103 is considered a tank since its designated combat role matched those of other tanks within contemporary Swedish doctrine.

History 

In the mid-1950s, the Royal Swedish Army Materiel Administration's Ordnance Department put out a contract tender for next generation tank design to replace their Centurions. A consortium of Landsverk, Volvo and Bofors responded with a suggestion to revive an earlier domestic heavy tank design, known under the codename KRV, fitted with a 155 mm smoothbore gun in an oscillating turret. However, this configuration was deemed too expensive in comparison to the alternatives: A ("Anglo-American"), which was to purchase a 50-ton tank with high protection and mediocre mobility from either the UK or US; or Alternative T ("Tysk-Fransk", or "German-French") was a 30-ton tank with low protection and good mobility. Then, in 1956, Sven Berge of the Swedish Arms Administration proposed Alternativ S, a domestic alternative ("S" standing for "Swedish").

Design 

Studies of casualty reports from World War II and the Korean War revealed that the risk of being hit in combat was strongly related to height, with more than half of tank losses being the result of the turret being penetrated. Berge therefore concluded that any new design should be as low as possible. The radical solution was to eliminate the turret, which would also dispose of a vulnerable target area and make the tank much lighter. In terms of absolute height, the final design did not give the Strv 103 any significant advantage over its most likely opponent, the T-62. On the other hand, the Swedish Centurions towered over both with their  –  in height. However, the T-62 paid for its low profile with an extremely cramped interior and lack of gun depression. Tanks are often deployed in hull-down firing positions, either behind dug entrenchments or using the crest of a hill, in order to reduce the exposure of the vehicle to enemy fire. In this firing position, the level of exposure is determined by the distance between the bottom of the gun barrel and the top of the turret or vehicle, and the angle to which the vehicle is able to depress the gun barrel. Since the Strv 103 orients the entire tank to depress and elevate the barrel, in a hull down position it has very little apparent height and subsequent visual profile to the enemy. It could also lower the hull a further  by adjusting the suspension.

Being familiar with both the French Char B1's precision transmission, the exceptional turning performance of the short tracked assault guns, and the combat performance of the German StuG and Jagdpanzer series inspired Berge's design to solve the aiming problem through the use of a fully automated transmission and suspension system, which precisely turned and tilted the tank under the gunner's control. The gun itself would be fixed to the hull. This made it impossible to use a stabilised gun. As a result, the tank could not accurately move and fire at the same time, but the Swedish experience with Centurions suggested that, in order for tanks to reach acceptable accuracy, they would need to come to a halt anyway, and wrongly estimated that no breakthrough in stabilisation technology was likely within the foreseeable future.

Other features of the tank were also quite radical. The rifled gun, a Bofors 105 mm L74 with a barrel length of 62 Calibers, was able to use the same ammunition as the British Royal Ordnance L7, and would be equipped with an autoloader allowing a rate of fire of one round every three seconds, also allowing the crew to be reduced to two; a gunner/driver and the commander (most designs of the era used a crew of four), with one person being able to handle all functions of the tank from the ordinary position due to duplicate controls. This would of course only be used in emergencies, as the workload would be overwhelming, but apart from providing redundancy it also allowed the crew to shift tasks between them as situation required. The concept went through practical tests, that quickly revealed that a two-man crew would not be self-sufficient when considering the many tasks not directly related to handling the tank: in particular, routine maintenance, bivouacking, track-changes and reloading in field. While the last issue could have been solved by adding staff to the ammunition crews, it was decided that a third crew-member was needed. To enhance combat effectiveness, the third man was to be assigned as a rear driver/radio operator, facing the rear of the tank and equipped with a complete setup for driving. This allowed the tank to be driven backwards at the same speed as forwards, keeping its frontal armour pointed at the enemy, while relieving the commander of routine radio duty. The commander and gunner/driver both had the same set of sights and controls to fire the gun and drive the tank.

The tank was uniquely powered by two different kind of engines, a  Rolls-Royce K60 opposed-piston diesel for slow cruising and manoeuvring the tank in aiming, and a  Boeing 502 turbine for more power when travelling at higher speed or in severe terrain. The turbine was quickly found to be underpowered, and was replaced by a Caterpillar turbine delivering  after no more than 70 tanks had been produced, and retrofitted to all previous vehicles. This was the first use of a turbine engine in a production tank; the Soviet T-80 and US M1 Abrams would later be built with gas turbines for main propulsion. The concept was interesting enough that Bofors was asked to build a prototype of the suspension/drive train, which they completed successfully.

The Strv 103 was fully amphibious.

One tank in each platoon was fitted with a  dozer blade under the front hull, which was from outside the tank manually dropped and locked into working position with pins and support struts. The blade allowed it to do simple engineering tasks, like digging fire pits for the platoon, filling trenches for ease of passage and so forth. Once the task was completed, the blade was again manually returned to the position under the front hull and locked in place. Upon the introduction of the 103C model all tanks had a bulldozer blade fitted, both to speed up operations and for the increased protection of the lower hull.

Service 

In preparation for the defence plan of 1958 (Försvarsbeslut 1958 (FB58)) in Riksdagen (Swedish parliament), the procurement set Alternativ S against the two foreign alternatives Alternativ A and Alternativ T. While the domestic alternative was going to be more expensive, the defence committee report recommended "S" when weighing in the symbolic value of a domestic tank for a neutral country as well as the spin-off effects on Swedish industrial competence.

Riksdagen made the formal decision regarding FB58 on 4 February 1958, and a follow-on contract called for two production prototypes, which were completed in 1961. By this point, the army was so satisfied with the design that an initial pre-production order for 10 was placed in 1960.

With minor changes, the Alternativ S was adopted as the Stridsvagn 103 ("103" from being the third tank with a 10 cm calibre gun accepted into Swedish service). Full production started in 1967 and ended in 1971 with 290 delivered. The changes included a new gyro-stabilised commander's cupola armed with a 7.62 mm KSP 58 machine gun, and upgraded frontal armour. A unique slat armor grid could be mounted at the front to help defeat high-explosive anti-tank (HEAT) rounds; however, it was kept secret for many years and was to be fitted only in the event of war.

Despite its design, the Strv 103 was intended for offensive operations. The armoured brigades of the Swedish Army, which operated the Strv 103, were designated anfallsbrigader (assault brigades) and tasked with launching counter-offensives on enemy beachheads and airborne landings. The stated Swedish armoured doctrine contemporary to the tank describes an aggressive approach to armoured warfare, even in defensive situations. The design of the Strv 103, with its low profile, was based on protection rather than defensive battlefield behaviour.

In 1980, the Swedish Army requested all tanks in the inventory to be scrapped and replaced with an unspecified Stridsvagn 2000 (tank for usage past year 2000). In 1982, the Riksdag decided for severe reduction of the military budget in Defence Act of 1982, and instead decided the tank-fleet should go through a renovation and modification (REMO) to at least somewhat bring them up to standard while within the economic limits imposed.

Performance 

The Stridsvagn 103 never saw combat and so its design remains unproven. However, for its intended role in the 1960s, it had numerous advantages. In 1967, Norway carried out a two-week comparative observation test with the Leopard 1 and found that, with closed hatches, the 103 spotted more targets and fired faster than the Leopard while the situation was reversed when operating with hatches open. In April to September 1968, two 103s were tested at the British armour school in Bovington, which reported that "the turretless concept of the "S"-tank holds considerable advantage over turreted tanks". In 1973, the BAOR tested the 103. British crewmen received six weeks training and the vehicles were serviced by Swedish engineers. Over nine days of manoeuvres alongside the Chieftain tank, availability never fell under 90% and the final report stated, "It has not been possible to prove any disadvantage in the "S" inability to fire on the move." In 1975, two 103s were tested at the American armour center at Fort Knox. The trial demonstrated that the 103 fired more accurately than the M60A1E3, but on an average of 0.5 seconds slower.

In comparison with the Centurion, the shorter track of the Strv 103 meant it performed worse on soft ground (mud and snow), and its trench taking and vertical obstacle capabilities were also significantly lower: where the Centurion climbed a 100 cm wall, the 103 was barely able to climb an 80 cm wall. On hard terrain, the 103 on the other hand was far more manoeuvrable.

Variants 

 Stridsvagn 103B As the weight of the Strv 103 had increased compared to the pre-production tanks, the 103 turned out to be under-powered. Hence, a more powerful version of the same gas turbine, manufactured by Caterpillar, was introduced after the first production run of 80 tanks. The early version tanks (retroactively designated Strv 103A) were soon upgraded to B-standard. Adjustments to the hydro-pneumatic suspension increased elevation range from −10 through +12 degrees, to −11 through +16 degrees.
 Stridsvagn 103C An upgrade programme was started in 1986 to fit all vehicles with improved fire control systems. Also, each Strv 103 was fitted with a dozer blade, rather than just one per platoon. A further upgrade in 1987/88 replaced the Rolls-Royce engine with a newer  Detroit Diesel with more fuel cans placed along the sides to function as applique armour, and added a new laser rangefinder.
 Stridsvagn 103D In the mid-1990s, as the Swedish Armed Forces were looking for a new main battle tank, one Strv 103C was upgraded into the Strv 103D. The major changes were the installation of fire-control computer, thermal viewers for both the gunner and the commander, allowing the crew to fight at night-time and in bad weather conditions, and the installation of passive light enhancers for driving. Some minor changes to the suspension system and engine were also made. There was some consideration of adding both reactive and/or appliqué armour in the early 1990s, but, in the end, the Strv 103 was instead phased out of Swedish service in favour of the Stridsvagn 121 (leased Leopard 2A4s were used as a stop-gap measure), which entered service in 1997 (the last year that the Strv 103 was used to train tank crews). This prototype was used during the trials for the new main battle tank system for the Swedish Armed Forces alongside all the other tanks tested. For a few years this prototype was even tested under remote control. The sole Strv 103D is today on display at the Arsenalen national military vehicle museum, together with some 103C models. They are all still in running order.

Tanks on display 

The following exhibitions possess an S-tank on display:

 Sweden
 Försvarsmuseum Boden, Boden through Föreningen P5
 Försvarsfordonsmuseet Arsenalen, Härad, Sweden
 Swedish Army Museum, Stockholm
 Beredskapsmuseet, Helsingborg
 Denmark
Aalborg Forsvars- og Garnisonmuseum
 Germany
German Tank Museum (Deutsches Panzermuseum Munster)
 UK
The Tank Museum, Bovington
 Australia
Royal Australian Armoured Corps Memorial and Army Tank Museum
 France
Musée des Blindés, Saumur
 Russia
Kubinka Tank Museum

See also 

 Combined diesel and gas
 FV4401 Contentious: air-portable tank destroyer with gun-elevation through hydraulic suspension.
 VT tank: German turret-less MBT-project.

Tanks of comparable role, performance and era
 AMX-30: French main battle tank
 Chieftain: British main battle tank
 Leopard 1: German main battle tank
 M60 Patton: American main battle tank
 T-62: Soviet main battle tank
 T-64: Soviet main battle tank
 T-72: Soviet main battle tank
 TR-85: Romanian main battle tank
 Type 69/79: Chinese main battle tank
 Type 74: Japanese main battle tank
 Vijayanta: Indian main battle tank

References

Sources 

 
 Stridsvagn 103 S (E1995.105) at The Tank Museum
 Historien bakom Stridsvagn 103 "S"

External links 

 Society S-tank – Welcome to The S tank association – official site of the S tank association
 "Vapenverkan mot Stridsvagn 103" 20:28 minutes, English subtitles
 "Tank Chats #117 | Stridsvagn 103 | The Tank Museum, Bovington UK. Curator David Willey discusses the Cold War era Swedish Stridsvagn 103, also known as the 'S-Tank'.
	

Main battle tanks of the Cold War
Main battle tanks of Sweden
Tanks of Sweden
Amphibious tanks
History of the tank
Bofors
Gas turbine vehicles
Tanks with autoloaders
Military vehicles introduced in the 1960s